Sergei Valentinovich Gunko (born 12 January 1973) is a Russian professional football coach and a former player.

External links
 Career summary by sportbox.ru

1973 births
Living people
Russian footballers
Association football defenders
Russian football managers
FC Rubin Kazan players
FC Baltika Kaliningrad players
FC Sodovik Sterlitamak players
FC Kristall Smolensk players
FC Volga Ulyanovsk players